The Palm Beach Gardens Challenger was a tournament for female professional tennis players played on outdoor clay courts. The event was classified as an ITF $50,000 Tournament from 2003 to 2005 and ITF $25,000 Tournament from 2006 to 2008. It was held annually in Palm Beach Gardens, Florida, United States, from 2003 through to 2008. It was part of the ITF Women's Circuit from 2003-2008; a tier below the Women's Tennis Association.

History
The tournament made was downgraded in 2006 due to sponsorship reasons, and was shut down in 2008.

Past finals

Singles

Doubles

References
 http://www.itftennis.com/procircuit/tournaments/women's-tournament/info.aspx?tournamentid=1100006689

ITF Women's World Tennis Tour
Clay court tennis tournaments
Defunct tennis tournaments in the United States
Recurring sporting events established in 2003
Recurring sporting events disestablished in 2008
Pal
Women's tennis tournaments in the United States